Nied is a quarter of Frankfurt am Main, Germany. It is part of the Ortsbezirk West and is subdivided into the Stadtbezirke Nied-Nord and Nied-Süd.

References

Districts of Frankfurt